Effie J. Triantafilopoulos is a Canadian politician and lawyer who was elected to the Legislative Assembly of Ontario in the 2018 provincial election. She represents the riding of Oakville North—Burlington as a member of the Progressive Conservative Party of Ontario.

Prior to running for the Progressive Conservative Party of Ontario, Triantafilopoulos was a candidate for the Conservative Party of Canada in the 2015 election.  She placed second in Oakville North—Burlington, behind Pam Damoff. She was also a candidate for the Progressive Conservative Party of Ontario in the riding of Mississauga South during the 2014 Ontario provincial election, finishing second to Charles Sousa. In addition, she has been chief of staff for several federal Conservative ministers.

Electoral record

References

Progressive Conservative Party of Ontario MPPs
21st-century Canadian politicians
Living people
21st-century Canadian women politicians
Women MPPs in Ontario
Conservative Party of Canada candidates for the Canadian House of Commons
Lawyers in Ontario
Canadian women lawyers
Canadian people of Greek descent
Year of birth missing (living people)
Place of birth missing (living people)